Donald Clark (25 October 1917 – 21 August 2014) was an English professional footballer who played as a centre forward. Born in Bristol, Clark played in the Football League for hometown club Bristol City between 1938 and 1951, scoring 67 goals in 117 games. He is 12th in the list of top scorers for Bristol City had holds the club record for most goals scored in a season - 42 in 1946/47.

His son Brian was also a professional footballer.

References 

1917 births
2014 deaths
English footballers
Bristol City F.C. players
English Football League players
Association football forwards